Combinatory categorial grammar (CCG) is an efficiently parsable, yet linguistically expressive grammar formalism. It has a transparent interface between surface syntax and underlying semantic representation, including predicate–argument structure, quantification and information structure. The formalism generates constituency-based structures (as opposed to dependency-based ones) and is therefore a type of phrase structure grammar (as opposed to a dependency grammar).

CCG relies on combinatory logic, which has the same expressive power as the lambda calculus, but builds its expressions differently. The first linguistic and psycholinguistic arguments for basing the grammar on combinators were put forth by Steedman and Szabolcsi. 

More recent prominent proponents of the approach are Pauline Jacobson and Jason Baldridge. In these new approaches, the combinator B (the compositor) is useful in creating long-distance dependencies, as in "Who do you think Mary is talking about?" and the combinator W (the duplicator) is useful as the lexical interpretation of reflexive pronouns, as in "Mary talks about herself". Together with I (the identity mapping) and C (the permutator) these form a set of primitive, non-interdefinable combinators. Jacobson interprets personal pronouns as the combinator I, and their binding is aided by a complex combinator Z, as in "Mary lost her way". Z is definable using W and B.

Parts of the formalism

The CCG formalism defines a number of combinators (application, composition, and type-raising being the most common). These operate on syntactically-typed lexical items, by means of Natural deduction style proofs. The goal of the proof is to find some way of applying the combinators to a sequence of lexical items until no lexical item is unused in the proof. The resulting type after the proof is complete is the type of the whole expression. Thus, proving that some sequence of words is a sentence of some language amounts to proving that the words reduce to the type S.

Syntactic types

The syntactic type of a lexical item can be either a primitive type, such as S, N, or NP, or complex, such as S\NP, or NP/N.

The complex types, schematizable as X/Y and X\Y, denote functor types that take an argument of type Y and return an object of type X. A forward slash denotes that the argument should appear to the right, while a backslash denotes that the argument should appear on the left. Any type can stand in for the X and Y here, making syntactic types in CCG a recursive type system.

Application combinators

The application combinators, often denoted by > for forward application and < for backward application, apply a lexical item with a functor type to an argument with an appropriate type. The definition of application is given as:

Composition combinators

Type-raising combinators

Example

The sentence "the dog bit John" has a number of different possible proofs. Below are a few of them. The variety of proofs demonstrates the fact that in CCG, sentences don't have a single structure, as in other models of grammar.

Let the types of these lexical items be

 

We can perform the simplest proof (changing notation slightly for brevity) as:

 

Opting to type-raise and compose some, we could get a fully incremental, left-to-right proof.  The ability to construct such a proof is an argument for the psycholinguistic plausibility of CCG, because listeners do in fact construct partial interpretations (syntactic and semantic) of utterances before they have been completed.

Formal properties 

CCGs are known to be able to generate the language  (which is a non-context-free indexed language). A grammar for this language  can be found in Vijay-Shanker and Weir (1994).

Vijay-Shanker and Weir (1994) demonstrates that Linear Indexed Grammars, Combinatory Categorial Grammars, Tree-adjoining Grammars, and Head Grammars are weakly equivalent formalisms, in that they all define the same string languages. Kuhlmann et al. (2015) show that this equivalence, and the ability of CCG to describe , rely crucially on the ability to restrict the use of the combinatory rules to certain categories, in ways not explained above.

See also
Categorial grammar
Combinatory logic
Embedded pushdown automaton
Link grammar
Type shifter

References

Baldridge, Jason (2002), "Lexically Specified Derivational Control in Combinatory Categorial Grammar." PhD Dissertation. Univ. of Edinburgh.
Curry, Haskell B. and Richard Feys (1958), Combinatory Logic, Vol. 1. North-Holland.
Jacobson, Pauline (1999), “Towards a variable-free semantics.” Linguistics and Philosophy 22, 1999. 117–184
Steedman, Mark  (1987), “Combinatory grammars and parasitic gaps”. Natural Language and Linguistic Theory 5, 403–439.
Steedman, Mark (1996), Surface Structure and Interpretation. The MIT Press.
Steedman, Mark (2000), The Syntactic Process. The MIT Press.
Szabolcsi, Anna (1989), "Bound variables in syntax (are there any?)." Semantics and Contextual Expression, ed. by Bartsch, van Benthem, and van Emde Boas. Foris, 294–318.
Szabolcsi, Anna (1992), "Combinatory grammar and projection from the lexicon." Lexical Matters. CSLI Lecture Notes 24, ed. by Sag and Szabolcsi. Stanford, CSLI Publications. 241–269.
Szabolcsi, Anna (2003), “Binding on the fly: Cross-sentential anaphora in variable-free semantics”. Resource Sensitivity in Binding and Anaphora, ed. by Kruijff and Oehrle.  Kluwer, 215–229.

Further reading
 Michael Moortgat, Categorial Type Logics, Chapter Two in J. van Benthem and A. ter Meulen (eds.) Handbook of Logic and Language. Elsevier, 1997, 
 homepages.inf.ed.ac.uk

External links 
 The Combinatory Categorial Grammar Site
 The ACL CCG wiki page (likely to be more up-to-date than this one)
 Semantic Parsing with Combinatory Categorial Grammars – Tutorial describing general principles for building semantic parsers

Grammar frameworks
Combinatory logic
Type theory